The canton of Gouzon is an administrative division of the Creuse department, in central France. It was created at the French canton reorganisation which came into effect in March 2015. Its seat is in Gouzon.

It consists of the following communes: 
 
Blaudeix
La Celle-sous-Gouzon
Le Chauchet
Chénérailles
Cressat
Domeyrot
Gouzon
Issoudun-Létrieix
Jarnages
Ladapeyre
Lavaveix-les-Mines
Parsac-Rimondeix
Peyrat-la-Nonière
Pierrefitte
Pionnat
Puy-Malsignat
Saint-Chabrais
Saint-Dizier-la-Tour 
Saint-Julien-le-Châtel
Saint-Loup
Saint-Médard-la-Rochette
Saint-Pardoux-les-Cards
Saint-Silvain-sous-Toulx
Trois-Fonds
Vigeville

References

Cantons of Creuse